Bala Bandar Kheyl (also Romanized as Bālā Bandār Kheyl; also known as Bandār Kheyl and Pendār Kheyl) is a village in Mazkureh Rural District, in the Central District of Sari County, Mazandaran Province, Iran. At the 2006 census, its population was 5,255, in 1,385 families.

References 

Populated places in Sari County